Francesco Tornielli (1693–1752) was an Italian Jesuit, preacher, and writer.

Born in Cameri. Known for his poetic preaching, he also enjoyed singing and wrote Sette canzonette in aria marinaresca, sopra le sette principali feste di nostra Signora  (Milan,  1738, octavo and Modena, 1818, 16avo). Also among his published works are Prediche quaresimali (Milan, 1753, quarto) and Bassano, 1820, quarto); Panegirici e discosi sacri (Milan, 1767, octavo and Bassano, 1822, octavo). His eulogy by Loya was published in Piemontesi illustri.

References

18th-century Italian Jesuits